William Charles Sutherland (June 7, 1865 – March 2, 1940) was the second Speaker of the Legislative Assembly of Saskatchewan (1908–1912), i.e., the presiding officer of the  legislature.  Sutherland was a Liberal Member of the Legislative Assembly who was first elected in the first general election on December 13, 1905, to the first legislature of the newly formed Province of Saskatchewan.

Sutherland represented the electoral district of Saskatoon, and served with Premier Walter Scott. He was re-elected in the 1908 and 1912 elections to represent Saskatoon County. On May 23, 1906, Sutherland introduced a resolution to move the capital of the province from Regina to Saskatoon, but the motion was defeated by a vote of 21–2 in the legislature. He died on March 2, 1940.

Saskatoon Club

Sutherland, Fred Engen, F. S. Cahill, H.L. Jordan and James Straton were the first members of the executive committee for the Saskatoon Club. The Saskatoon Club was established as a club for social purposes to serve business, professional and community leaders as a supplement the role of the Board of Trade in Saskatoon and Saskatchewan.

A Legacy Honored, A Life Remembered 
On the 30th day of August, 1909 Sutherland, Saskatchewan was officiated a village incorporated under the namesake of William Charles Sutherland. This, in honor of the Sutherland's pioneering political role of service as community councilman  in 1906, during the early phases of the neighbourhood formation.
He was an area rancher who later farmed, and practised law in the Saskatoon area. Jno Henry, Charles Willoughby, Wm Richardson, Wm Chas Sutherland, Frederick Engen, and Albert Herman Hanson owned the land at Section 29 Township 36 Ramge 5 West of the Third Meridian.
According to the City of Saskatoon archives, William Charles Sutherland "helped to secure the University of Saskatchewan for Saskatoon."

External links
Government Relations | Office of Protocol and Honours
SASKATCHEWAN SPEAKERS OF THE LEGISLATIVE ASSEMBLY
SASKATCHEWAN MEMBERSHIP OF THE LEGISLATURES *
Saskatchewan's Top News Stories: Politics Liberals Carry Saskatchewan--Scott Government Sustained But *[http://saskliberal.ca/ Saskatchewan Liberals

References

Speakers of the Legislative Assembly of Saskatchewan
Politicians from Saskatoon
Canadian civil servants
20th-century Canadian historians
Canadian male non-fiction writers
Saskatchewan Liberal Party MLAs
Writers from Saskatoon
1865 births
1940 deaths